The Minister of State in the Vice-President's Office is a non-cabinet ministerial position in the government of Zimbabwe. There are two incumbents: Flora Buka and Sylvester Nguni. The duties of the position have yet to be publicly defined.

References

Government of Zimbabwe